To the Ground is the fourth album by folk band Kerfuffle.

Track listing

Personnel
Sam Sweeney (fiddle, viola, cajon, drums, bagpipes, vocals)
Hannah James (accordion, vocals)
Jamie Roberts (guitar, vocals, mandola, ukulele)
Tom Sweeney (bass guitar, vocals)
Dr Andy Lectcher (bagpipes on "Dr Letcher's Favourite")

2008 albums
Kerfuffle albums